Indigastrum is a genus of flowering plants in the tribe Indigofereae of the family Fabaceae.

Species
Indigastrum comprises the following species:
 Indigastrum argyraeum (Eckl. & Zeyh.) Schrire
 Indigastrum argyroides (E. Mey.) Schrire
 Indigastrum burkeanum (Benth. ex Harv.) Schrire
 Indigastrum candidissimum (Dinter) Schrire
 Indigastrum costatum (Guill. & Perr.) Schrire
 subsp. costatum (Guill. & Perr.) Schrire
 subsp. goniodes (Baker) Schrire
 subsp. macrum (E. Meyer) Schrire
 subsp. theuschii (O. Hoffm.) Schrire

 Indigastrum fastigiatum (E. Mey.) Schrire
 Indigastrum guerranum (Torre) Schrire
 Indigastrum niveum (Willd. ex Spreng.) Schrire & Callm.
 Indigastrum parviflorum (Heyne ex Wight & Arn.) Schrire
 subsp. occidentalis (B. Heyne ex Wight & Arn.) Schrire
 subsp. parviflorum (B. Heyne ex Wight & Arn.) Schrire
 var. crispidulum (J.B. Gillett) Schrire
 var. parviflorum (B. Heyne ex Wight & Arn.) Schrire

Species names with uncertain taxonomic status
The status of the following species is unresolved:
  Indigastrum macrostachyum Jaub. & Spach

References

External links

Indigofereae
Fabaceae genera